John Smart (1740–1811) was an English painter of portrait miniatures.

John Smart may also refer to:

 John Smart (landscape artist) (1838–1899), Scottish painter
 John Elliott Smart (1916–2008), officer in the Royal Navy
 John Smart (skier) (born 1965), Canadian freestyle skier
 John Karefa-Smart (1915–2010), politician from Sierra Leone

See also
 Jack Smart (disambiguation)